Anita Leocádia Benário Prestes (born 27 November 1936 in Berlin) is a German-Brazilian historian. She is the daughter of political activists Olga Benário Prestes and Luís Carlos Prestes.

She was born in Barnimstraße Women's Prison in Berlin and was handed over to the care of her paternal grandmother, Leocádia Prestes, at age 14 months. Her mother Olga was sent to Ravensbrück concentration camp and from there to a former psychiatric hospital in Bernburg in 1942, where she was gassed.

In 1964, Prestes achieved a degree in Chemistry from the then "University of Brazil", now known as the Universidade Federal do Rio de Janeiro (UFRJ). Two years later she gained a Masters in Organic Chemistry.

Life in the USSR 

At the beginning of the 1970s, Prestes moved into exile in the USSR. In August 1972, she was indicted in Brazil for political activities, with the Conselho Permanente de Justiça para o Exército (the Army supreme court) sentencing her in absentia to 4 years and 6 months in prison.

In December 1975 Prestes earned a Doctorate in Political Economics from the Institute of Social Science in Moscow and four years later in September 1979, the Brazilian courts reduced Prestes's sentence by four years as part of a wider amnesty.

Return to Brazil 

In 1989 Prestes received a Doctorate in History from the Fluminense Federal University, Rio de Janeiro, with a thesis named A Coluna Prestes (The Prestes Column), which was the movement commanded by her father of almost 1500 men fighting against the presidency of Artur Bernardes. She is now a retired associate professor of Brazilian History, but she continues teaching on the Master's and Doctorate's Compared History Program at the Universidade Federal do Rio de Janeiro (UFRJ).

Books

References

External links
 Curriculum Vitae. CNPq Lattes System (In Portuguese).

Living people
1936 births
20th-century Brazilian historians
Brazilian people of German-Jewish descent
Brazilian expatriates in the Soviet Union
Jewish historians
People granted political asylum in the Soviet Union
21st-century Brazilian historians